Denys Arendaruk (born 16 April 1996) is a retired professional Ukrainian football striker.

Career
Arendaruk is a product of the FC Metalurh and FC Shakhtar youth sportive schools.

He played for FC Shakhtar Donetsk in the Ukrainian Premier League Reserves and in February 2018 Arendaruk went on loan for the another Ukrainian Premier League team – FC Mariupol, where he was promoted to the senior squad. He made his debut in the Ukrainian Premier League for Mariupol on 7 April 2018, playing as a second half-time substituted player in a losing match against FC Vorskla Poltava.

He was also a member of the different age-levels Ukraine national youth football teams.

References

External links
 
 

1996 births
Living people
Footballers from Zaporizhzhia
Ukrainian footballers
Association football forwards
FC Shakhtar-3 Donetsk players
FC Mariupol players
FC Rukh Lviv players
FC Rubikon Kyiv players
Piast Gliwice players
Ukrainian Second League players
Ukrainian Premier League players
Ukrainian expatriate footballers
Ukrainian expatriate sportspeople in Poland
Expatriate footballers in Poland
Ukraine youth international footballers
Ukraine under-21 international footballers
Ukrainian First League players